Somewhere on Tour was a concert tour by heavy metal band Iron Maiden, from 10 September 1986 to 21 May 1987, supporting their album Somewhere in Time. The band performed across the globe, in countries including Poland, Italy, the United States and England. The tour lasted 253 days, during which the band performed 151 shows. The tour commenced in Belgrade, Serbia (Yugoslavia) at the time.

Background
"When we did Inside the Electric Circus, we went on a big world tour with Iron Maiden", recalled Blackie Lawless of W.A.S.P., the opening act in November and December 1986. "We had the same management. There were a lot of times we went on their bus. Both of us felt we had sort of put out tired records by tired bands."

The Somewhere on Tour production was the most ambitious to date. Band used seven or eight 45 foot articulated trucks packed with over 100 tons of equipment, three crowd buses for 60 people and two nightliners for five musicians. The band – owned customized Turbosound system was probably the biggest  in the world used indoors. Total power (PA and stage monitors) was estimated at 180.000 watts.  The vast and flexible lighting rig held over 1100 lamps hanged over futuristic stage set including flying space ships, inflatable props, laser guns, pyrotechnics, hydraulic stands, backdrops and monumental Eddie's appearance. The tour was a big success everywhere.

Setlist
 Intro: "End Titles" from Blade Runner (by Vangelis)
 "Caught Somewhere in Time" (from Somewhere in Time, 1986)
 "2 Minutes to Midnight" (from Powerslave, 1984)
 "Sea of Madness" (from Somewhere in Time, 1986) (Dropped after 8 January 1987)
 "Children of the Damned" (from The Number of the Beast, 1982)
 "Stranger in a Strange Land" (from Somewhere in Time, 1986)
 "Wasted Years" (from Somewhere in Time, 1986)
 "Rime of the Ancient Mariner" (from Powerslave, 1984)
 Guitar solo "Walking on Glass"
 "Where Eagles Dare" (from Piece of Mind, 1983) (Dropped after 22 October 1986)
 "Heaven Can Wait" (from Somewhere in Time, 1986)
 "Phantom of the Opera" (from Iron Maiden, 1980)
 "Hallowed Be Thy Name" (from The Number of the Beast, 1982)
 "Iron Maiden" (from Iron Maiden, 1980)
Encore
 "The Number of the Beast" (from The Number of the Beast, 1982)
 "Run to the Hills" (from The Number of the Beast, 1982)
 "Running Free" (from Iron Maiden, 1980)
 "Sanctuary" (from Iron Maiden, 1980) (Dropped after 18 December 1986)

Notes:
 "Wrathchild" (from Killers, 1981) was performed in the UK, in cities where the band had two or more shows: the second nights in Manchester (11 October 1986), Edinburgh (28 October 1986) and Birmingham (31 October 1986). Also performed on all nights in Japan.
 The guitar duet "Walking on Glass, was written and played (as a true guitar solo) by Adrian Smith the previous year when he and Nicko McBrain played two shows as The Entire Population of Hackney. Not played on the very last night in Japan.
 First of seven tours in which the supported album's closing track wasn't played.
 "The Loneliness of the Long Distance Runner" was performed on the opening night in Belgrade for the first time, never again to appear on a Maiden setlist.
 "Flight of Icarus" (from Piece of Mind, 1983) was performed on the first six nights, then it was replaced by "Phantom of the Opera". It was the last tour to include "Flight of Icarus" in the setlist until the Legacy of the Beast World Tour in 2018.

Tour dates

References

Cancellations
 18 October 1986: Ipswich, England, Gaumont Theatre; CANCELLED (Due to health problems.)
 19 December 1986: Rome, Italy, Teatro Tenda; CANCELLED
 20 December 1986: Bologna, Italy, Teatro Tenda; CANCELLED
 21 December 1986: Padua, Italy, Teatro Tenda; CANCELLED
 24 January 1987: Beaumont, United States, Beaumont Civic Center; CANCELLED (Due to poor ticket sales.)

References

External links
 Official website
 Somewhere on Tour Dates

Iron Maiden concert tours
1986 concert tours
1987 concert tours